The National Archives of India (NAI) is a repository of the non-current records of the Government of India and holds them in trust for the use of administrators and scholars. Originally established as the Imperial Record Department in 1891, in Calcutta, the capital of British India, the NAI is situated at the intersection of Janpath and Rajpath, in Delhi. It functions as an Attached Office of the Department of Culture under the Ministry of Culture, Government of India.

History

The Imperial Record Department was set up on 11 March 1891 in Calcutta (Kolkata). G. W. Forrest was named as department head..The Imperial Records Department was charged with aggregating, appraising, and managing the documents of all departments of the British Government. It was headed by the Keeper of Records. After independence, the post was renamed Director of Archives.

In 1911 the Department was transferred to the new capital, New Delhi, and in 1926 it was shifted into its new building. This was one of four museum and archive buildings planned by its architect Edwin Lutyens around 'Point B' in the city plan, the intersection of King's Way and Queen's Way. However, only this one was built. It is a building in late neo-classical style, and originally known as the Imperial Record Office.

K. R. Narayanan, then President of India, declared the "Museum of the National Archives" open to the general public on 6 July 1998. This museum provides a representative overview of the multifarious holdings of the National Archives, and promotes a common man's interest in archival holdings.

The NAI has a Regional Office at Bhopal and three Record Centres at Bhubaneswar, Jaipur and Pondicherry.

Records
The holdings in the National Archives are in a regular series starting from the year 1748. The languages of the records include English, Arabic, Hindi, Persian, Sanskrit and Urdu, and their materials include paper, palm leaf, birch bark and parchment. The records are in four categories: Public Records, Oriental Records, Manuscripts and Private Papers.

There has been a certain amount of criticism regarding the lack of care taken in preservation and handling of records.

Exhibitions 
The National Archives of India also holds regular exhibitions such as the display of declassified files on Subhas Chandra Bose in 2016 and the recent exhibition, "The Jammu and Kashmir Saga", commemorating 70 years of Jammu and Kashmir's accession to India which was held from 10 January 2018 to 10 February 2018. Between 1973 and 2015 NAI has held 108 exhibitions on various themes.

Abhilekh patal 
Abhilekh patal is an online portal to access National Archives of India’s reference media and its digitized collections via the internet. The name 'Abhilekh patal' comes from the Sanskrit word 'Abhilekh' meaning the records of ancient times and the word 'patal' meaning the platform, board or a surface. It is a work in progress.

Gallery

See also 
 List of national archives
 List of archives in India

References

Further reading
 Dinyar Patel. "Repairing the Damage at India’s National Archives." New York Times, March 21, 2012.

External links
 National Archives of India, Official Website.
 Abhilekh-Patal (Portal for access to archives & learning)

Archives in India
Ministry of Culture (India)
Historiography of India
India
Organizations established in 1891
Neoclassical architecture in India
Library buildings completed in 1926
1891 establishments in India
Works of Edwin Lutyens in India